The 1931 Dissolution Honours List was issued on 17 November 1931 at the advice of the Prime Minister, Ramsay MacDonald.

Viscountcy
 The Right Honourable Philip Snowden, Chancellor of the Exchequer, 1924 and 1929–1931.

Baronies
 Sir Robert Hunt Stapylton Dudley Lydston Newman, Bt., J.P., D.L., Member of Parliament for Exeter 1918–1931. For public and political services.
 Sir William Martin Conway, M.A., LL.D., F.S.A., Member of Parliament for the Combined English Universities 1918–1931. For public and political services.

Knighthoods
 George Masterman Gillett, Esq., J.P., M.P. Member of Parliament for Finsbury since 1923. Secretary, Department of Overseas Trade, 1929 – August 1931. Parliamentary Secretary to the Ministry of Transport, August to October, 1931.
 John Charles Watson, Esq., M.B.E., K.C. Solicitor General for Scotland, 1928–1931.

References

Dissolution Honours
Dissolution Honours 1929